Canala Airport  is an airport serving Canala, a commune in the North Province of New Caledonia, an overseas territory (territoire d'outre-mer) of France in the Pacific Ocean.

References

Airports in New Caledonia